Silverton is a surname. Notable people with the surname include:

Kate Silverton (born 1970), English journalist, newsreader, and broadcaster
Michael Silverton, American computer scientist
Nancy Silverton (born 1954), American chef, baker, and author